Ricardo Hugo Sagardia Medrano (born March 4, 1993, in Bolivia) is a Bolivian  footballer who since 2011 has played defender for Bolívar.

Club career statistics

References

External links
 

1993 births
Living people
Bolivian footballers
Club Bolívar players
Association football defenders